Almaty University of Power Engineering and Telecommunications (AUPET) (Kazakh: Алматы Энергетика және байланыс университеті) is a technical engineering university in Almaty, Kazakhstan. It is located at 126 Baitursynov Street in Almaty and has around 4,000 students. It is one of the best-known universities in the field of power engineering and telecommunications in the Central Asian region. Students from all over central Asia study there. They live in three campuses with Wi-Fi internet access, video cassette record, online library and recreation facilities.

AUPET is building a third educational case with a new modern athletic field. Undergraduate students can receive a second bachelor's degree in economics from the Moscow Power Engineering Institute simultaneously with studying at AUPET.

Faculties
AUPET has four full-time faculties:
 Power engineering
 Electrical engineering
 Telecommunications
 Information Technologies

References

External links
Official website 

Education in Almaty
Universities in Kazakhstan